The Bangladesh Collaborators (Special Tribunals) Order, 1972 is a law enacted in 1972 by the Government of Bangladesh to establish a tribunal to prosecute local collaborators who helped or supported the Pakistan Army during the Bangladesh Liberation War and the 1971 Bangladesh genocide. An estimated 11,000 collaborators were arrested. An estimated 2,884 cases were filed at the tribunal until October 1973. Of those accused, 752 received sentencing. Many detainees were released after the 15 August 1975 Bangladeshi coup d'état.

Background
What happened in Bangladesh between 25 March and 16 December 1971 epitomized the spirit of the human will as well as man's unlimited capacity to be brutal towards fellow men. Rarely in the history of mankind have a people displayed so much heroism and suffered so much pain within the space of so short a time as the people of Bangladesh did.

During this war some Bengali civilians took the side of Pakistani Army of occupation. They collaborated the army to occupy the whole Bangladesh and supported the atrocities committed by them.

The members of Pakistan Muslim League, Jamaat-e-Islami, Nizam-e-Islam joined the Peace Committee, which was actually formed to support the atrocities. A dummy cabinet was formed under Nurul Amin in which Abul Kashem, Nawajesh Ahmed, AKM Yousuf, Abbas Ali Khan, Maolana Ishak joined. Obaydullah Mazumder, an Awami League leader also joined in the cabinet. After liberation 46 MNAs from Awami League was denounced or relegated from the party.
On the other hand, under the supervision of Pakistani Army another force named Rajakar was formed to replace the Ansar. Jamaat-e-Islami leader AKM Yousuf, with 96 members of Jamaat-e-Islami started a training camp in Khulna Ansar and VDP camp to fight against the freedom fighters. Most of the Rajakar personnel were the members of Jamaat-e-Islami

Al-Shams and Al-Badr was also formed in order to counter the guerrilla activities of the Mukti Bahini which grew increasingly organised and militarily successful during the second half of 1971. All three groups operated under Pakistani command.

On this regard, Sheikh Mujibur Rahman on his repatriation in Bangladesh on 10 January 1972, declared to try the collaborators along with the Pakistani Army who committed genocide and atrocities.

Genesis
The process to try the collaborators during the first days of Bangladesh was not going through any legal process. People were angry and were killing the collaborators without any trail. These activities tarnished the overall image of the nation. Some were being killed because of personal issues. So the government was forced to create a law and begin a trial to pacify the agitation.

Law
The Bangladesh Collaborators (Special Tribunals) Order, 1972 was announced to try the local war criminals. On 24 January 1972 an order came in effect.

The constitution of Bangladesh was also amended to include Article 47 (3) in order to fasten the trial of members "of any armed or defence or auxiliary forces" for genocide, crimes against humanity or war crimes. In addition, The International Crimes (Tribunals) Act, 1973 was announced on 20 July 1973 mainly to try the Pakistani war criminals.

The government also announced a two-tier trial process where national and international jurists would be appointed to try some high-profile war criminals, while an all-Bangladeshi jurist panel would try the rest.

Statements of the government 
Many statements were provided by the responsible officials of the government of Bangladesh regarding this issue.

Sheikh Mujibur Rahman on his arrival on 10 January 1972 ensured that the collaborators will be tried along with their Pakistani masters. But he also asked his people to give the responsibility to the government
Sheikh Mujibur Rahman ordered Awami League leaders to gather proof against the collaborators and assured that the collaborators will be tried for times and again. On 12 January 1972, Rahman addressed people, saying that the criminals will not go unpunished under his government.

Mujib on 14 January asked the Awami League activists not to take revenge and assured that legislative measures will be taken against the collaborators in time.

On 30 March, in a public gathering in Chittagong he asked the people should he pardon the collaborators or not. The people of Chittagong said, "No and never".

Implementation
The implementation of the law started on 15 February when an order signed by secretary Taslimuddin Ahmed was circulated stating that 14 top collaborators have to surrender. The list was made addressing Nurul Amin, Ghulam Azam, Khan A Sabur, Shah Azizur Rahman, Maulana Muhammad Ishaq, Khawaja Khayeruddin, Mahmud Ali, AKM Yousuf, Abbas Ali Khan and many others as collaborators. Awami League leader Obaydullah Mazumder of Feni was among the list of the collaborators.

Later some 50,000 collaborators were arrested under the act. Among them 752 were found guilty and was punished.

About 37,471 cases were filed under this law till October 1973. On 28 March 73 tribunals were formed to try the collaborators. It was also declared that other courts will refrain from the cases under these tribunals.

Sentences
About 2,884 cases were solved and the verdict was given under this law till October 1973 before the general amnesty was declared by Mujib. Only 752 of them were found guilty and only one of them was sentenced capital punishment. As many as two thousand were acquitted after the trial.
 On 10 February 1973 life imprisonment was sentenced against Maulana Muhammad Ishaq for collaboration.

Two Jamaat-e-Islami leaders, AKM Yousuf and Abbas Ali Khan, were arrested under the law. After the war, Yousuf was sentenced to life imprisonment under the 1972 Collaborator's Order.

Sa'ad Ahmed, a leader from Kushtia was sentenced life imprisonment for supporting the atrocities as an East Pakistan Central Peace Committee member and taking part in the election of 1971.

Chikon Ali, a Rajakar from Mirpur of Kushtia was sentenced to death on 10 June 1972, which was the first ever verdict of capital punishment under the law. The punishment of Chikon Ali was later cut short by the Supreme Court to life imprisonment.

An absentia trial staged under the law gave death penalty to three Al-Badr members for the murder of prominent Professor Dr. AK Azad on 6 October 1972. The culprits were never found.

On 11 April 1972, Rajakar Abdul Hafiz of Comilla was sentenced 41 years imprisonment, highest in the history of this law. He was tried for various convictions like murder, rape, loot etc.

In the July 1972, three brothers of Bogra were given punishment as Nurul Islam of same area filed a murder case them. Mofizur Rahman aka Chan Miah was sentenced to death, Mokhlesur Rahman aka Khoka Mia and Moshiur Rahman aka Lal Miah were sentenced to life imprisonment.
After appealing against their punishment Chan Miah was sentenced to 20 years imprisonment while his two brothers were sentenced to 10 years imprisonment both.

Keramat Ali of Munshiganj was sentenced to 8 years imprisonment because of his activity as a Peace Committee member.

A special tribunal sentenced Mokbul Hossain, Ayub Ali and Atiar Rahman to life imprisonment on the Montu murder case.

Al-Badr members Siddiqur Rahman and Muhammad Galib were sentenced life imprisonment on the journalist Nizamuddin murder case.

Criticism
The Collaborators Act 1972 was a flawed law with many defects. It was amended for at least three times within one year. Many criticised the law because of its defects and irregularities.

Unaccepted
The pro-Awami League researcher Shahriar Kabir in cross examination confessed that the trials occurred under this act were never accepted by the families of the martyrs.

Shahin Reza, son of famous journalist Shirajuddin Hossain stated that, the trial of the collaborators was nothing but a kangaroo trial to protect the collaborators. Those who were involved in murders and genocides were set free and the innocents were imprisoned without substantial proof.

Khaleque Mazumder, who killed Shahidullah Kaiser was sentenced to only a seven years imprisonment under the act. Panna Kaiser, the widow of Shahidullah Kaiser marked it as a humiliation of humanity and justice.

Politicization
Prominent political leaders and intellectuals like Maolana Bhashani, Abdur Rashid Tarkabagish, Abul Mansur Ahmed, Justice S M Morshed, Alim AL Razy, Enayetullah Khan, Ataur Rahman Khan and many others started criticizing the law because of the abusive measures.

Sheikh Mujibur Rahman himself started facing problems while the process to try the collaborators begun. The Awami League leaders and activist getting order from Mujib to submit genocide data started to misusing the power. They started to use the power against their personal foes.

On the other hand, many political parties and its members were convicted of collaboration with Pakistanis. So many of them started criticising the steps taken by the government because of political benefit.

Legal problems

The Collaborators Act faced major legal problems as it was created in a very short time. Barrister Moinul Hossain, an Awami League backed Member of Parliament criticized the law in an article published in The Daily Ittefaq on 19 November 1972.

Barrister Moinul Hossain stated:

On the other hand, this law had a provision in its section 7 which stated that the conviction against the criminals will come in effect only if the Officer in Charge of the Police of that particular area certify that as an offence. According to the act, No cases can be filed in the tribunal if the Officer in Charge defies.

Many police officers took the side of the Pakistani Government during the Bangladesh Liberation War. And most of the families of the collaborators were enough solvent to pay a good margin to police officers. So police officers were not enough conscious about these cases.

Another defect was that the act gave the convicts an opportunity to appeal against the verdict while the victims were not given such opportunity.

On 23 July 1972 in an article published on Dainik Bangla some experts stated that,

Prominent writer Ahmed Sharif, Shahriar Kabir stated the Collaborators Act 1972 as a safeguard to the collaborators and war criminals.

Later during a cross examination on 10 September 2012, Shahriar Kabir confessed that the International Crimes Tribunal Act 1973 was created to overcome the problems of the Collaborators Act 1972.

Sheikh Mujibur Rahman was also concerned about the failures of the Collaboration Act 1972. The call of general amnesty in 1973 was somehow influenced because of his concern about this law.

Flawed process
The Collaborators Act 1972, soon started to prove itself as a spiderweb. The number of big flies trapped in it were very low. Dr. Malik, Maulana Muhammad Ishaq, AKM Yousuf, Izhar Ahmed were the only big figures to be punished. Many others who were directly involved in genocide were freed or went underground.

The uncle of Sheikh Mujibur Rahman, Sheikh Mosharraf Hossain was a Rajakar. He sent him to jail. But soon many such cases started to arise.

Awami Muslim League leader Rajakar Athar Ali Khan was the father of a freedom fighter from Bagerhat who attained the gallantry award Bir Uttam for his bravery. Athar Ali Khan did not face any trial because of his son.

A Rajakar who later joined Bangladesh Rifles (Presently known as Border Guards Bangladesh) after liberation war remained untouched and promoted in a higher post during Sheikh Mujibur Rahman regime.

Taslimuddin Ahmed, who signed the notification for the 14 collaborators asking them to surrender was himself a collaborator. Another surprising scenario was staged in a special tribunal where a Rajakar recruiting officer became the judge and gave verdict against the one whom he recruited as Rajakar. Many such situations was raised that time.

After liberation war, a committee was formed under Nilima Ibrahim to find out the collaborators who worked in Radio Pakistan. 43 people were found by the committee who worked for Pakistan. Unfortunately no action were taken against them as they were the part of progressive society as well as Awami League and some of them were killed by Pakistanis.

Lieutenant Colonel Firoz Salahuddin, who recruited many Rajakar and was loyal to the Pakistan Army till the end of liberation war was rehabilitated in the Bangladesh Army after the liberation war for having close relation with M. A. G. Osmani.

General amnesty
As the second anniversary of victory in the Bangladesh Liberation War approached, most of those jailed under the Collaborators Act had been detained for nearly two years without being charged with specific crimes. It was proving difficult to obtain sufficient evidence for prosecution. Villagers were reluctant to testify because of fear of retaliation. Also public sentiment had grown less concerned with punishing collaborators and more worried about the shattered economy. The continued imprisonment of alleged collaborators and threat of legal action against those not yet arrested was increasingly viewed as an attempt to silence political opposition. It was having the opposite effect by creating fresh social tensions.

In addition to domestic considerations, there were international ones. In August 1973, the Delhi Agreement had started the repatriation of prisoners of war, but two significant issues remained. First, Bangladesh wanted Pakistan to accept hundreds of thousands of Biharis who had remained loyal to Islamabad during the war, still considered themselves citizens of Pakistan, and didn't want to live in the now independent Bangladesh. Second, Bangladesh wanted 195 Pakistani POWs tried for war crimes. Sheik Mujib desired diplomatic recognition by Pakistan and membership in the United Nations, something China was blocking at the behest of her ally Pakistan. Bangladesh also sought more favorable relations with the oil-rich Muslim Middle East in the hope that foreign aid would be forthcoming.

In this climate, Sheik Mujib announced on 1 December 1973 a general amnesty for 36,400 alleged collaborators. The pardon did not extend to the few thousand prisoners charged with wartime murder, rape, or arson.

Declaration
The declaration was depicted in the newspapers on 1 December 1973. Dainik Bangla stated the news with the headline, "General Amnesty Declared upon the Punished Prisoners under Collaborators Act".
The newspaper said,

It added that,

As a result of the amnesty, 21,000 prisoners had been released by 17 December 1973.

Aftermath
Many prominent collaborators were freed after the declaration gradually.

Khwaja Khairuddin, who was the chief of the Peace Committee was freed from jail on 7 December 1973.

Muslim League leader Khan A Sabur was freed from jail on 5 December 1973.

Repeal of the law
After the fall of Mujib on 15 August 1975 and unfortunate killing of four top leaders from Bangladesh Awami League, an ordinance was declared which halted the activity under this act. Later on President Abu Sadat Mohammad Sayem repealed the act on 31 December 1975. This gave the lackeys of Pakistani occupational force a complete legal protection from farther facing any kind of trial.

Text of the ordinance
Whereas it is expedient to repeal the Bangladesh Collaborators (Special Tribunals) Order, 1972 (P.O. No. 8 of 1972), and to provide for certain matters ancillary thereto;

Now, Therefore, in pursuance of the Proclamations of 20 August 1975, and 8 November 1975, and in exercise of all powers enabling him in that behalf, the President is pleased to make and promulgate the following Ordinance:-

1. This Ordinance may be called the Bangladesh Collaborators (Special Tribunals) (Repeal) Ordinance, 1975.
2. # (1) The Bangladesh Collaborators (Special Tribunals) Order, 1972 (P.O. No. 8 of 1972), hereinafter referred to as the said Order, is hereby repealed.
 (2) Upon the repeal of the said Order under sub-section (1), all trials or other proceedings thereunder pending immediately before such repeal before any Tribunal, Magistrate or Court, and all investigations or other proceedings by or before any Police Officer or other authority under that Order, shall abate and shall not be proceeded with.
 (3) Nothing in sub-section (2) shall be deemed to affect -
 (a) the continuance of any appeal against any conviction or sentence by any Tribunal, Magistrate or Court under the said Order; or
 (b) except to the extent provided in that sub-section, the operation of section 6 of the General Clauses Act, 1897 (X of 1897).

References

Bibliography
 .
 .
 
 .
 .

Repealed Bangladeshi legislation
1972 in Bangladesh
Aftermath of the Bangladesh Liberation War